The 1908 Clemson Tigers football team represented Clemson Agricultural College—now known as Clemson University—as a member of the Southern Intercollegiate Athletic Association (SIAA) during the 1908 college football season. Led by Stein Stone in his first and only season as head coach, the team posted an overall record of 1–6 with a mark of 0–4 in SIAA play. Stricker  Coles was the team captain.

Schedule

References

Bibliography
 

Clemson
Clemson Tigers football seasons
Clemson Tigers football